Taylor Branch is a  long 2nd order tributary to the Leipsic River in Kent County, Delaware.

Course
Taylor Branch rises on the Fork Branch divide at Shaws Corner, Delaware.

Watershed
Taylor Branch drains  of area, receives about 44.9 in/year of precipitation, has a topographic wetness index of 622.47 and is about 4.8% forested.

See also
List of rivers of Delaware

References 

Rivers of Delaware
Rivers of Kent County, Delaware